Wolfgang Glüxam (17 November 1958 – 29 July 2020) was an Austrian harpsichordist and organist.

Life 

His CD recordings have been released by the Austrian radio. Among others, they include Bach's Goldberg Variations, Pièces de clavecin by Jacques Duphly and four-handed sonatas by W.A. Mozart (with Patrick Ayrton). He also played a harpsichord player in the 1995 film Before Sunrise.

References

External links 
 
 Wolfgang Glüxam auf YouTube

Austrian harpsichordists
Austrian classical organists
University of Music and Performing Arts Vienna alumni
1958 births
2020 deaths
People from Melk